Good Love is the second studio album by American recording artist Meli'sa Morgan, released in 1987 under Capitol Records. The album reached number 11 on the US Billboard R&B Albums chart, and two singles released both peaking at number-two on the R&B singles chart, "If You Can Do It: I Can Too!", and the duet "Love Changes" with singer Kashif.

Track listing
Credits taken from original album liner notes. European edition

Charts

Singles

Credits
Executive Producer – Beau Huggins
Producer – Kashif (tracks: 2, 5, 6), Lesette Wilson (tracks: 3, 4, 7 to 9), Meli'sa Morgan (tracks: 3, 4, 7 to 9), Carl Sturken (tracks: 2), Evan Rogers (tracks:2)

References

1987 albums
Meli'sa Morgan albums
Capitol Records albums